Benjamin Thomas Brooks, Sr. (born April 23, 1950) is an American politician. He is a Democratic member of the Maryland Senate for District 10, based in Baltimore County, since 2023. He was previously a member of the Maryland House of Delegates for District 10 from 2015 to 2023.

Early life and career
Brooks was born in Sumter, South Carolina and attended Ebenezer High School. After high school, he joined the United States Army in Vietnam in 1969, serving until 1972. His awards and service ribbons include the Army Good Conduct Medal, National Defense Medal, and the Vietnam Service Medal. In 1976, he earned a B.S. in accounting from South Carolina State University, and worked as a junior accountant at Seagram from 1976 to 1978, and as a cost accountant from 1978 to 1987. Brooks has served as the owner of the B&R Brooks Professional Tax Service since 1987, and as the President of Brooks Family Investments since 2004.

Since 2010, Brooks has been a member of the Baltimore County Democratic Central Committee. From 2011 to 2013, he served on the Baltimore County Board of License Commissioners.

Since 2012, Brooks has served as a member of the Sojourner–Douglass College Board of Directors.

In the legislature
Brooks has been a member of the Maryland House of Delegates since January 14, 2015. Since 2017, he has served as the Deputy Majority Whip for the Maryland House Democratic Caucus.

In February 2019, Brooks attempted to declare his candidacy to replace Nancy Kopp as the Maryland State Treasurer, but failed to do so because he missed the deadline for doing so. Brooks would receive 24 votes in the legislative election, coming second behind Kopp, who received 134 votes.

In December 2020, GenOn Energy Holdings announced that it would cease operations at the Morgantown Generating Station by 2027, in agreement with the Maryland Coal Community Transition Act of 2021, legislation proposed by Brooks and state senator Christopher R. West. In March 2021, Brooks withdrew the bill in favor of a "summer study" to be conducted during the legislative interim, displeasing climate activists. In June 2021, GenOn announced that it would retire its Morgantown coal firing plant by June 2022, five years ahead of schedule.

Committee assignments
 Economic Matters Committee, 2015–present (alcoholic beverages subcommittee, 2015–present; property & casualty insurance subcommittee, 2015–2018; chair, public utilities subcommittee, 2019–present; chair, joint electric service program work group, 2020–present)
 House Chair, Joint Electric Universal Service Program Work Group, 2020–present

Other memberships
 Secretary, Baltimore County Delegation, 2018–present
 Legislative Black Caucus of Maryland, 2015–present (treasurer, 2016–2018; 2nd vice-chair, 2018–2019; 1st vice-chair, 2019–2020)
 Maryland Legislative Sportsmen's Caucus, 2015–present
 Maryland Veterans Caucus, 2015–present
 Task Force to Study Methods to Reduce the Rate of Uninsured Drivers, 2015
 Task Force to Investigate the Challenges of and Opportunities for Minorities in Business, 2016–2018
 Maryland Small Business Retirement Savings Board, 2016–present
 Advisory Council on the Impact of Regulations on Small Businesses, 2017–present

Electoral history

References

External links

 

Democratic Party members of the Maryland House of Delegates
Living people
1950 births
People from Sumter, South Carolina
21st-century American politicians
Democratic Party Maryland state senators